Part of Baffin Island's offshore islands within Hudson Strait, the Nuvursiit Islands are located southeast of Kimmirut. The islands are part of the Qikiqtaaluk Region, in the Canadian territory of Nunavut.

References 

Archipelagoes of Baffin Island
Islands of Hudson Strait
Uninhabited islands of Qikiqtaaluk Region